2017–18 Hong Kong Senior Challenge Shield was the 116th season of the Hong Kong Senior Shield. 10 teams entered this edition, with two games being played in Round 1 before the Quarter Final stage. The competition was only open to teams that play in the 2017–18 Hong Kong Premier League.

The champions, Yuen Long, received HK$150,000 in prize money while the runners up, Eastern, received HK$50,000. The MVP of the final received a HK$10,000 bonus.

Calendar

Source: HKFA

Bracket
{{4RoundBracket-Byes
| RD1=First Round
| RD2=Quarter-finals
| RD3=Semi-finals
| RD4=Final
| RD4b=

| team-width=14em
| score-width=3em
| score-align=

| RD1-team03= Rangers
| RD1-score03=1 (5)| RD1-team04= Dreams FC 
| RD1-score04=1 (4)

| RD1-team07= 
| RD1-score07=
| RD1-team08= 
| RD1-score08=

| RD1-team11= R&F
| RD1-score11=1
| RD1-team12=Lee Man| RD1-score12=2

| RD1-team15=
| RD1-score15=
| RD1-team16=
| RD1-score16=

| RD2-team01=Kitchee| RD2-score01=5| RD2-team02=Rangers
| RD2-score02=0

| RD2-team03=Tai Po
| RD2-score03=2
| RD2-team04=Yuen Long| RD2-score04=4*| RD2-team05=Southern| RD2-score05=2| RD2-team06=Lee Man
| RD2-score06=0

| RD2-team07=Eastern| RD2-score07=3
| RD2-team08=Pegasus
| RD2-score08=1

| RD3-team01=Kitchee
| RD3-score01=1
| RD3-team02=Yuen Long| RD3-score02=3* 

| RD3-team03=Southern
| RD3-score03=0
| RD3-team04=Eastern| RD3-score04=1

| RD4-team01=Yuen Long| RD4-score01=3
| RD4-team02=Eastern
| RD4-score02=0
}}Bold''' = winner
* = after extra time, = penalty shootout score

Fixtures and results

First round

Quarter-finals

Semi-finals

Final

References

External links
 Senior Shield - Hong Kong Football Association

2017-18
2017–18 in Hong Kong football
2017–18 domestic association football cups